"Poison à la Carte" is a Nero Wolfe mystery novella by Rex Stout, first published in April 1960 in the short-story collection Three at Wolfe's Door (Viking Press).

Plot summary

A group of gourmets, who call themselves the Ten for Aristology, invite Wolfe's chef Fritz to cook their annual dinner. Wolfe and Archie are included by courtesy. Twelve young women, one per guest, serve the food — they are actresses supplied by a theatrical agency, and are termed "Hebes," after the cupbearer to the gods in the Greek pantheon (later replaced by Ganymede). A member of the Ten, Vincent Pyle, is poisoned and Wolfe quickly concludes that arsenic was administered by a server. Pyle is an investor in Broadway productions, and it's clearly possible that he knew one or more of the Hebes.

Plot devices used in "Poison à la Carte" appear in other Wolfe stories. For example, the list of possible murderers (here, the Hebes) gaining access to the victim one by one recalls Too Many Cooks, "Fourth of July Picnic" and The Silent Speaker. Then the murderer is trapped into making incriminating statements at John Piotti's restaurant, a location used for an identical purpose in Gambit. And Fritz cooks dinner for the Aristologists on another occasion, in The Doorbell Rang, an experience that leaves him considerably more chagrined than does the one described here.

The unfamiliar word
"Like all of us, Wolfe has his favorite words, phrases, and sayings," wrote William S. Baring-Gould. "Among the words, many are unusual and some are abstruse."

Examples of unfamiliar words — or unfamiliar uses of words that some would otherwise consider familiar — are found throughout the corpus, often in the give-and-take between Wolfe and Archie.

 Aristology, chapter 1. "The word has never become more than a marginal addition to the language, a source of obscure scholarly humour rather than a term of utility," wrote etymologist Michael Quinion. "It's best known from books by Rex Stout, in which his corpulent protagonist, Nero Wolfe, has a couple of encounters with a group of gourmets, the Ten for Aristology." "The earliest citation in The Oxford English Dictionary is from 1835," wrote ABC NewsRadio. "This rare word turns up in one of Rex Stout's delightful mystery novels featuring the fat detective Nero Wolfe — in a book entitled 'Poison a la Carte'."

Publication history

"Poison à la Carte"
1968, Ellery Queen's Mystery Magazine, April 1968
1973, Ellery Queen's Anthology, Spring–Summer 1973

Three at Wolfe's Door
1960, New York: The Viking Press, April 29, 1960, hardcover
Contents include "Poison à la Carte", "Method Three for Murder" and "The Rodeo Murder"
In his limited-edition pamphlet, Collecting Mystery Fiction #10, Rex Stout's Nero Wolfe Part II, Otto Penzler describes the first edition of Three at Wolfe's Door: "Orange cloth, front cover and spine printed with dark brown. Issued in a mainly green-brown dust wrapper."
In April 2006, Firsts: The Book Collector's Magazine estimated that the first edition of Three at Wolfe's Door had a value of between $200 and $350. The estimate is for a copy in very good to fine condition in a like dustjacket.
1960, New York: Viking (Mystery Guild), July 1960, hardcover
The far less valuable Viking book club edition may be distinguished from the first edition in three ways:
 The dust jacket has "Book Club Edition" printed on the inside front flap, and the price is absent (first editions may be price clipped if they were given as gifts).
 Book club editions are sometimes thinner and always taller (usually a quarter of an inch) than first editions.
 Book club editions are bound in cardboard, and first editions are bound in cloth (or have at least a cloth spine).
1961, London: Collins Crime Club, January 20, 1961, hardcover
1961, New York: Bantam #A-2276, August 1961
1995, New York: Bantam Crime Line  September 1995, paperback, Rex Stout Library edition with introduction by Margaret Maron
1997, Newport Beach, California: Books on Tape, Inc.  October 31, 1997, audio cassette (unabridged, read by Michael Prichard)
2010, New York: Bantam Crimeline  June 9, 2010, e-book

Adaptations

A Nero Wolfe Mystery (A&E Network)
"Poison à la Carte" was adapted for the second season of the A&E TV series A Nero Wolfe Mystery (2001–2002). Directed by George Bloomfield from a teleplay by Lee Goldberg and William Rabkin, the episode made its debut May 26, 2002, on A&E.

Timothy Hutton is Archie Goodwin; Maury Chaykin is Nero Wolfe. Other members of the cast (in credits order) include Colin Fox (Fritz Brenner), Bill Smitrovich (Inspector Cramer), R.D. Reid (Sergeant Purley Stebbins), Hrant Alianak (Zoltan Mahany), Carlo Rota (Felix Courbet), David Hemblen (Louis Hewitt), Dominic Cuzzocrea (Vincent Pyle), James Tolkan (Adrian Dart), David Schurmann (Emil Kreis), Gary Reineke (Mr. Leacraft), Jack Newman (Mr. Schriver), Michelle Nolden (Helen Iacono), Emily Hampshire (Carol Annis), Hayley Verlyn (Fern Faber), Sarain Boylan (Nora Jaret), Dina Barrington (Lucy Morgan) and Lindy Booth (Peggy Choate). Choreographer Vanessa Harwood appears, uncredited, in the introductory sequence.

In addition to original music by Nero Wolfe composer Michael Small, the soundtrack includes music by W. C. Handy (titles), Wolfgang Amadeus Mozart, Felix Mendelssohn and Dick Walter.

In international broadcasts, the 45-minute A&E version of "Poison a la Carte" is expanded into a 90-minute widescreen telefilm. Boyd Banks, Christine Brubaker and Nicky Guadagni make uncredited appearances in the international version.

A Nero Wolfe Mystery is available on DVD from A&E Home Video.

References

External links

 Script (PDF) for "In Bad Taste," written by Lee Goldberg and William Rabkin, a draft combining the episodes "Poison a la Carte" and "Murder Is Corny" into a two-hour movie (December 15, 2001)

1960 short stories
Nero Wolfe short stories